Ouija 4 is the DVD re-titled release of the 2015 Hong Kong horror film Are You Here, originally released as Dip Sin Dip Sin directed by Jill Wong. It is an unofficial sequel to Ouija and Ouija: Origin of Evil made by Blumhouse Productions (also following the re-titled horror film Ouija 3: The Charlie Charlie Challenge distributed by Cinedigm). This film is completely unrelated to the official Blumhouse Ouija film series. Unlike Ouija 3: The Charlie Charlie Challenge, this entry does feature a Ouija board.

Plot
Business partners get caught up in a game of supernatural horror when playing an Ouija board online.

Release
Released on DVD 3 April 2018 by Cinedigm.

References

External links

2015 horror films
2015 films
Hong Kong supernatural horror films
2010s Hong Kong films